Ana Ivanovic defeated Dinara Safina in the final, 6–4, 6–3 to win the women's singles tennis title at the 2008 French Open. It was her first and only major singles title. With the win, Ivanovic also became the world No. 1; Maria Sharapova, Jelena Janković and Svetlana Kuznetsova were also in contention for the top ranking. Ivanovic dropped only one set during the tournament, to Janković in the semifinals.

Justine Henin was the three-time reigning champion and reigning world No. 1, but she retired from the sport in May 2008. This left Serena Williams as the only former French Open champion in the draw; when Williams was defeated in the third round by Katarina Srebotnik, a first-time French Open champion was guaranteed.

Safina reached the final after having come back from a set and match point down in both her fourth round and quarterfinal matches, against Sharapova and Elena Dementieva, respectively.

This was also the first major main draw appearance for future world No. 2 and two-time Wimbledon champion Petra Kvitová, who lost to Kaia Kanepi in fourth round. With that win, Kanepi became the first Estonian to reach a major quarterfinal.

Seeds

Qualifying

Draw

Finals

Top half

Section 1

Section 2

Section 3

Section 4

Bottom half

Section 5

Section 6

Section 7

Section 8

Championship match statistics

References

External links
Draw and Qualifying Draw
2008 French Open – Women's draws and results at the International Tennis Federation

Women's Singles
French Open by year – Women's singles
French Open - Women's Singles
French Open – Women's singles
French Open – Women's singles